Chestnut Hill Realty is a privately held real estate company based in Chestnut Hill, Massachusetts, that specializes in purchasing, renovating, developing, operating and leasing real estate, with a focus on multi-family residential housing.

CHR owns and manages 28 apartment communities comprising more than 4,700 units in Greater Boston and Rhode Island. The company's holdings are valued at more than $1 billion.

History 
Chestnut Hill Realty was established by Edward Zuker in 1969. Zuker continues to serve as CEO of the company, which employs several members of the Zuker family in various capacities. The company's first office was at 369 Harvard Street in Brookline, Massachusetts. For more than 20 years, the corporate office was located at 1223 Beacon Street in Brookline and the company's headquarters is now at 300 Independence Drive in Chestnut Hill, Massachusetts.

Services 
Service offerings include apartment rentals, corporate/temporary housing, real estate development and commercial leasing.

Awards 
Chestnut Hill Realty received the Rental Housing Association Community of Excellence Award in 2008 for its Brattle Arms, Cambridge, Massachusetts, property and RHA's Community of Excellence Award in 2009 for Hancock Village, Chestnut Hill, Massachusetts. The company also has earned 31 horticultural awards from the Institute of Real Estate Management for landscaping at various properties between 2004 and 2011.

Chestnut Hill Realty founder Ed Zuker is a past recipient of the Rental Housing Association's Industry Excellence Award, the 2010 Urban Land Institute’s Jack Kemp Workforce Housing Models of Excellence Award for his contributions to the B’nai B’rith 33 Comm condominium development and the Mollie L. Moon Volunteer Service Award for his contributions as chairman of the Building Committee for the Urban League of Eastern Massachusetts.

Neighborhood Criticism 
Some residents of the South Brookline neighborhood adjacent to one of Chestnut Hill Realty's largest holdings (Hancock Village) have actively fought attempts to expand the development. In September, 2014, a judge dismissed a lawsuit intending to stop the proposed expansion.

Properties 
Chestnut Hill Realty's residential portfolio includes more than 4,700 apartment units, including seven properties with 124 units in Brighton, Massachusetts; seven properties with 463 units in Brookline, Massachusetts; and seven properties with 302 units in Cambridge, Massachusetts. Among the more prominent properties owned by the company are:

Greater Boston
 Hancock Village: a 789-unit townhome apartment community, originally build as housing for World War II veterans by Hancock Insurance, located on 80 acres in Boston, Brookline and Chestnut Hill, Massachusetts.
 1443 Beacon Street: a 115-unit luxury high-rise apartment building located in Coolidge Corner in Brookline, Massachusetts.
 Fenway Diamond Apartments at 9 Miner Street: a 49-unit luxury apartment building located in Fenway Area in Boston, Massachusetts.
 Longwood Towers: Alden Tower, an 86-unit high-rise in a 280-unit condominium community, located adjacent to the Longwood Medical Area in Brookline, Massachusetts.
 Ridgecrest Village: a 404-unit, single-level and townhome community located on two parcels of land in West Roxbury, Massachusetts.
 Norwood Gardens: a 344-unit, garden-style apartment community featuring single-level floorplans in a suburban setting.
 Norwest Woods: a 406-unit apartment community featuring townhomes and single-level floorplans and luxury amenities in Norwood, Massachusetts.
 Waterfall Hills at Canton: a 243-unit community of single-level apartments surrounded by conservation land in Canton, Massachusetts.
 Village Green: a 400-unit, single-level apartment community located in Plainville, Massachusetts.
 Water View: a 581-unit apartment community located on two parcels of land in Framingham, Massachusetts.

Rhode Island
 The Regency Plaza: a 444-unit luxury apartment tower in the heart of downtown Providence, Rhode Island, with 24-hour concierge services.
 Bay View Estates: a 130-unit apartment community Portsmouth, Rhode Island consisting of a high-rise tower and garden-style residences.

References

External links 
 Official corporate website
 Official apartment website

Companies based in Massachusetts
Real estate companies of the United States